Aoife Murray (born 1984 in Dunmanway) is a Camogie player and quantity surveyor based in Cork, winner of All Ireland medals in 2002, 2005, 2006, 2008, 2009, 2014, 2015, 2017 and 2018. All Star awards in 2004, 2008, 2009, 2012, 2014, 2015 and 2017. Minor, Junior, Intermediate as well as her Senior All-Ireland medals and Munster championship honours in all grades. Won three county Senior championship medals with Cloughduv and was captain in 2005 for their third county title. Sister of former Cork Senior hurler, Kevin Murray, who won an All- Ireland medal in 1999. A series of impressive saves in the 2009  All Ireland final won for her the "player of the match" award from RTÉ.

References

External links 
 Aoife Murray Profile in Irish Independent
 Official Camogie Website
  Inrerview with Aoife Murray in On The Ball Official Camogie Magazine
 Fixtures and results for the 2009 O'Duffy Cup
 All-Ireland Senior Camogie Championship: Roll of Honour
 Video highlights of 2009 championship Part One and part two
 Video Highlights of 2009 All Ireland Senior Final
 Report of 2009 All Ireland final in  Irish Times Independent and Examiner
 Reaction to 2008 All Ireland final Manager points to Aoife's saving grace
 Reports of 2008 All Ireland final in  Independent, Irish Times  Examiner,

1982 births
Living people
Camogie goalkeepers
Cork camogie players
People from Dunmanway